Hypotrachyna ahtiana is a species of foliose lichen in the family Parmeliaceae. It is named to honour Finnish lichenologist Teuvo Ahti.

References

ahtiana
Lichen species
Lichens described in 2009
Lichens of Venezuela
Taxa named by John Alan Elix
Taxa named by Thomas Hawkes Nash III
Taxa named by Harrie Sipman